Vly may refer to:

 A short form for Valley
 An alternate spelling for Vlaie, a Dutch name for a swamp
 Vly Mountain, a mountain located in the town of Halcott, New York, United States in Greene County
VLY may refer to:
 IATA code for Anglesey Airport (civilian) / RAF Valley (military) on Anglesey, Wales